Louisburg High School is in Louisburg, North Carolina. The student body has a mix of white, African American, and Hispanic students.  The school colors are orange and blue. Warriors are the school mascot.

History 
It was listed as a private school for whites in 1893. In 1913, funding was provided for it as a public school. Historian E. H. Davis was listed as principal of the school in 1915. W. R. Mills was principal in 1915–1916, its first four year high school term.

Demographics 
The demographic breakdown of the 536 students enrolled in the 2022–2023 school year was:
 American Indian – 0.4%
 Asian – 0.4%
 African American – 34%
 Hispanic – 27%
 Pacific Islander – 0.2%
 Caucasian – 33%
 Biracial – 5%

See also 
 Louisburg College
 List of high schools in North Carolina

References 

High schools in North Carolina
Schools in Franklin County, North Carolina